Anjana Rangan (born 25 August 1989) better known as V. J. Anjana, is one of the leading South Indian video jockey and anchor. She is known as an anchor in the Tamil channel Sun Music.
She is also credited as one of the Most Desirable Women, according to the Times of India.

She made her first acting on screen in the 2008 television personality competition Miss Chinnathirai 2008 where she emerged as the winner of the competition. She later started her career as a Television presenter and hosted successful shows such as Paattu.Com (2010), Paattu Pudusu (2011), Namma Star (2012), Natchathira Jannal (2013-2017), Box Office (2013), Konjam Uppu Konjam Karam (2014), Dance Jodi Dance 3.0  (2014), Neengalum Naangalum (2015), Cafe Tea Area (2016), Junior Super Stars (2017), Sunday Kondattam (2017), Freeya Vidu (2017) and Vazhthukkal (2018).

Career 
Anjana Rangan was born on 25 August 1989 in Chennai. Before becoming a video jockey, she was a television host. Anjana also won Miss Chinnathirai 2008 before becoming an anchor or a video jockey. Anjana also anchored in television shows such as Neengalum Naangalum, Namma Star, Konjam Uppu Konjam Karam and Paattu Pudusu.

In early-2018, Anjana decided to go on a break after 10 years in the entertainment industry and Sun TV to prioritize family commitments.

After her break Anjana returned to anchoring in 2019, she anchored in shows like Junior Super Stars, Natchathira Jannal on Puthuyugam TV and Sunday Kondattam on Sun TV. She was also ranked 15 in Chennai Times 20 Most Desirable Women on TV 2019. She was also yet again listed in 2020 ranking her 11th.

Anjana faced cyber bullying and harassment over social media, she received vulgar and inappropriate messages on Twitter and Instagram from audiences and followers, eventually Anjana and her husband reported the issue to cyber crime security and Tamil Nadu Police.

During the launch event of the film Pushpa: The Rise which was hosted by Anjana, fans criticized Anjana saying that the main actor of the film Allu Arjun walked away from the stage due to how Anjana treated him. However Anjana later clarified that all those rumors were false on social media.

Personal life 
Anjana married actor Chandran on March 10 in 2016. In 2018 the couple had a son.

Filmography

Selected Television

 Miss Chinnathirai 2008Contestant (winner)
 Paattu.ComHost
 Paattu PudusuHost
 Namma StarHost
 Konjam Uppu Konjam KaramHost
 Dance Jodi Dance 3.0Host
 Box OfficeHost
 Neengalum NaangalumHost
 Natchathira JannalHost
 Cafe Tea AreaHost
 Junior Super StarsHost
 Sunday KondattamHost
 Freeya ViduHost
 VazhthukkalHost

Health 
Anjana Rangan was tested positive to COVID-19 on 19 January 2022, However she later recovered from the virus.

References

External links

1989 births
21st-century Indian actresses
Actresses from Chennai
Female models from Chennai
Tamil television actresses
Living people
Indian television presenters
Indian women television presenters
People from Chennai
Television personalities from Tamil Nadu
Tamil television presenters